Robert LeSage (born February 15, 1937) is a Canadian retired politician and civil servant. He served in the National Assembly of Quebec from 1989 to 1998 as a member of the Liberal Party. His name is sometimes given as Lesage.

Early life and career

LeSage was born in Hull (Gatineau), Quebec, and studied legislation and administration at the École des hautes études commerciales at Carleton University in Ottawa. He became a civil servant in Hull in 1961 and served for nineteen years as the city's clerk. He was president of the Liberal Party association in Hull from 1979 to 1981.

Legislator

LeSage entered political life in 1989, winning the Liberal nomination for a provincial by-election in Hull. While seeking the nomination, he championed a four-lane highway extension from Hull to Aylmer through the southern end of Gatineau Park and dismissed concerns from environmentalists that it would jeopardize the area's wildlife. He was elected without difficulty in the by-election and was returned again in the 1989 general election a few months later. The Liberal Party had a majority government in this period, and LeSage served as a backbench supporter of Robert Bourassa's administration. He supported Bourassa's compromise language legislation, which required that outdoor commercial signs be in the French language while indoor signs were allowed to be bilingual. He was also a supporter of the Meech Lake Accord, which was designed to recognize Quebec as a "distinct society" within the Canadian constitution.

The Meech Lake Accord was rejected in June 1990. LeSage was critical of Queen Elizabeth II's visit to Hull shortly thereafter, saying "Perhaps the queen wants to celebrate the grand Canadian unity, but it doesn't exist."

A Canadian federalist, LeSage was appointed to a legislative committee to study the costs of Quebec sovereigntism in 1991. In 1993, he suggested that the Outaouais region would separate from Quebec (and remain a part of Canada) if Quebec ever chose to separate from Canada. He was quoted as saying, "it's almost criminal to promote Quebec sovereignty in the Outaouais because the federal government is so important to the area's survival.

As a backbencher, LeSage was a vocal proponent of building the Casino du Hull. The casino was eventually constructed in 1996, two years after its approval by the Liberal government.

LeSage was re-elected in the 1994 provincial election, defeating  former mayor Michel Légère. The Liberals lost power to the Parti Québécois, and LeSage served as his party's critic for Revenue in the official opposition. He campaigned for the "Non" side in the 1995 Quebec referendum on sovereignty.

LeSage offered to resign his seat in 1998 to allow Jean Charest to enter the National Assembly (he made this offer when Charest was being encouraged to seek the leadership of the Quebec Liberal Party, but before he had decided to leave federal politics). Charest ultimately did not take up LeSage's offer and instead ran in Sherbrooke in the 1998 provincial election. LeSage did not seek re-election in this campaign.

Electoral record

References

1937 births
Living people
Politicians from Gatineau
Quebec Liberal Party MNAs